Saint-Henri-de-Taillon is a municipality in Quebec, Canada.

Demographics
Population trend:
 Population in 2016: 821 (2011 to 2016 population change: 8.0%)
 Population in 2011: 760 (2006 to 2011 population change: 2.8%)
 Population in 2006: 739
 Population in 2001: 776
 Population in 1996: 743
 Population in 1991: 714

Private dwellings occupied by usual residents: 296 (total dwellings: 476)

Mother tongue:
 English as first language: 1.4%
 French as first language: 97.3%
 English and French as first language: 1.4%
 Other as first language: 0%

See also
 List of municipalities in Quebec

References

Municipalities in Quebec
Incorporated places in Saguenay–Lac-Saint-Jean